Red Lamb is an American heavy metal band formed in 2010 in Palm Beach, Florida. Members of the band have included Dan Spitz, Don Chaffin, Patrick Johansson and Chris Vrenna. The band released one self-titled album.

Band members 
Current
 Dan Spitz – guitars (2010–present) (ex-Anthrax)
 Don Chaffin – lead vocals (2010–present)

Former
 Dave Mustaine – vocals (20112012) (Megadeth)
 Chris Vrenna – programming, synths (Nine Inch Nails, Marilyn Manson)
 Patrick Johansson – drums (W.A.S.P.)
 Randy Coven – bass

Discography 
 Red Lamb (2012)

References 

2010 establishments in Florida
Heavy metal musical groups from Florida
Musical groups established in 2010